

Glen Forrest is a suburb within the Shire of Mundaring, south of John Forrest National Park, west of Mahogany Creek, east of Darlington, and north of the Helena River. Its northern boundary is determined by the Great Eastern Highway.

The area was originally named Smith's Mill, after A. C. Smith & Son's jarrah saw mill, established in October 1877. In 1915 local residents petitioned to change the area's name to Glen Forrest, to honour Sir John Forrest, first Premier of Western Australia.

The suburb is bisected by a disused railway track - the original route of the Eastern Railway - which is now known as the Railway Reserve Heritage Trail, and Nyaania Creek.

It has a number of significant conservation reserves including the Glen Forrest Super Block, which is adjacent to Ryecroft Road (the main connecting road to Darlington).

The major early industries were forestry, and the Stathams Brickworks, which had its own siding, just east of the railway yard. The brickworks was located on a patch of white clay that is now a park and recreation area.

It has two commercial areas - one adjacent to and just north of the former railway station site, and the other at the intersection of Hardey Road and Great Eastern Highway.

Like Darlington to the west, Glen Forrest had at its earliest times a winery, Glen Hardey, on the valley edge down which Hardey Road passes.

Gallery

Notes

References

External links
 Glen Forrest on Geoscience Australia
 Mundaring and Hills Historical Society website

Suburbs and localities in the Shire of Mundaring
Darling Range